Marciano José (born Filomeno López López, 15 November 1900 – 9 October 1934) was a religious of the De La Salle Brothers and one of the Martyrs of Turon. He was canonized by Pope John Paul II on 21 November 1999.

He was killed in 1934 in the Asturian town of Turón during the Asturias revolt. At the time, religious education was suppressed, which forced the Brothers of La Salle to change their clothes by posing as peasants. Marciano José took the position of a cook at the School of Our Lady of Covadonga, since the position was abandoned by the previous cook due to the revolution.

When it was discovered that religion classes were still being taught at the school, on 5 October 1934, the mayor ordered the entire community to be imprisoned, including the Passionist priest Innocencio of Mary Immaculate who was with them. However, the cook was released for being mistaken as a simple employee. Marciano did not accept his release by clarifying that he was also a member of the school which led him to suffer torture and harassment along with all his classmates. On 9 October 1934, they were shot.

See also
 Martyrs of Turon
 List of Mexican saints

References

1900 births
1934 deaths
Spanish Roman Catholic saints
20th-century Roman Catholic martyrs